Krishna Rao (died 1857)  was an Indian administrator who served as the acting Diwan of Travancore from 1842 to 1843 and the full-fledged Diwan from 1846 to 1857.
After the death of krishna rao in 1857, T. Madhava Rao was chosen to the high office of dewan by the Maharaja of Travancore.

References

1857 deaths
Diwans of Travancore
Year of birth unknown